Harvey Bartle III (born June 6, 1941) is a senior United States district judge of the United States District Court for the Eastern District of Pennsylvania.

Education and career

Born in Bryn Mawr, Pennsylvania, Bartle received a Bachelor of Arts degree in 1962 from Princeton University. He received a Bachelor of Laws in 1965 from the University of Pennsylvania Law School. He served in the United States Army Reserve from 1966 to 1972, attaining the rank of Captain. He served as a law clerk for Judge John Morgan Davis of the United States District Court for the Eastern District of Pennsylvania, from 1965 to 1967. He was in private practice in Philadelphia, Pennsylvania from 1967 to 1979 and again from 1981 to 1991. He served as the Insurance Commissioner for the Commonwealth of Pennsylvania from 1979 to 1980. He served as the Attorney General for the Commonwealth of Pennsylvania from 1980 to 1981.

Federal judicial service

Bartle was nominated by President George H. W. Bush on May 15, 1991, to a seat on the United States District Court for the Eastern District of Pennsylvania vacated by Judge Joseph Leo McGlynn, Jr. He was confirmed by the United States Senate on September 12, 1991, and received commission on September 16, 1991. He served as Chief Judge from 2006 to 2011, succeeding Judge James T. Giles. He assumed senior status on October 1, 2011. He was a member of the Judicial Conference of the United States from 2008 to 2011.

References

Sources
 

1941 births
Living people
Judges of the United States District Court for the Eastern District of Pennsylvania
Pennsylvania Attorneys General
Princeton University alumni
United States district court judges appointed by George H. W. Bush
20th-century American judges
University of Pennsylvania Law School alumni
21st-century American judges